Kevin Ross Adkisson (born May 15, 1957) is an American retired professional wrestler, better known by his ring name, Kevin Von Erich. A member of the Von Erich family, Von Erich is best known for his appearances with his father's World Class Championship Wrestling promotion. He is a one-time world champion, having held the WCWA World Heavyweight Championship.

Football career 
Adkisson played football at North Texas State University as a fullback, second string to Garry Smith, until an injury ended his football career and dream of playing in the National Football League.

Professional wrestling career

World Class Championship Wrestling (1976–1990)

Early career (1976–1981) 

Adkisson started wrestling as Kevin Von Erich in 1976. He spent most of his career wrestling for his father's promotion, World Class Championship Wrestling. Kevin's natural athletic ability and good looks made him one of the promotion's biggest stars. He achieved great success in the company both as a singles and tag team wrestler, often participating in many of the company's high-profile feuds. Kevin was also known for wrestling barefoot, highly unusual in a sport where almost all wrestlers wear high-topped boots. World Class announcers often jokingly referred to him as "The Barefoot Boy" on WCCW broadcasts. Kevin later admitted in an interview that he never set out to wrestle barefoot, but that before one of his matches someone hid his boots as a joke, and he wasn't able to find them before his match, so just went out barefoot to wrestle, and it later became his trademark. Contrary to popular belief, he wore boots in matches in his early career, including his debut match against Paul Perschmann aka Playboy Buddy Rose and in a match against Superfly Jimmy Snuka. Kevin was a big fan of Snuka's, who also wrestled barefoot, and Kevin often performed a move similar to Snuka's flying body splash from the top rope, which Snuka called The Superfly.

During the late 70s, Kevin established himself in the Dallas territory. His first major success came in 1978 while wrestling as a tag team with his younger brother David. During the year, they captured the NWA Texas Tag Team Championship on two occasions as well as the NWA American Tag Team Championship. On Christmas Day 1978, he established himself firmly in the singles ranks of the promotion by defeating Bruiser Brody for the NWA American Heavyweight Championship. In 1980, Kevin Von Erich made his only wrestling appearance in the WWF on January 21 against Johnny Rodz, in a match he won. As the 1980s dawned, Kevin became one of the promotion's most viable performers and continued to win numerous championships in both singles and tag team competition with a variety of different partners. However, his highest profile partners would always be his brothers Kerry and David. As the early-1980s progressed, Kevin would appear often at other NWA-promoted territories, including St. Louis, Georgia Championship Wrestling and briefly Florida Championship Wrestling. Kevin also competed in a few matches for the World Wide Wrestling Federation.

Freebird-Von Erich Feud (1982–1984)
In early 1982, the Fabulous Freebirds, consisting of Michael Hayes, Terry Gordy and Buddy Roberts, left Georgia Championship Wrestling after meeting WCCW booker Gary Hart at a show. Appearing in World Class, the trio instantly became fan favorites due to a combination of their unique talents and chemistry as well as their close friendship with the Von Erichs. All three rose quickly through the ranks and in late November 1982, Hayes and Gordy defeated the team of King Kong Bundy and Wild Bill Irwin for the NWA American Tag Team Championship.

A feud between the Von Erichs and Freebirds developed roughly a month later. During WCCW's annual Christmas show in 1982, Kerry Von Erich faced Ric Flair for the NWA World Heavyweight Championship inside of a steel cage with Michael Hayes acting as a special referee. As explained in The Triumph and Tragedy of World Class Championship Wrestling DVD, the storyline, developed by Gary Hart, was written as Hayes having been selected by fans to be a special enforcer type of referee in the match. Near the end of the match, Flair shoved Hayes, which resulted in Hayes punching him. Hayes then tried to place Kerry on top of Flair to make the three count. Von Erich refused to do so since it wasn't the "Texas thing to do", which led to a brief shoving match and argument between the two. Hayes, disgusted with the situation, told Terry Gordy, who had been assigned as the gatekeeper, to open the cage door. As Hayes is about to leave Von Erich was attacked from behind by Ric Flair, with the former accidentally hitting Hayes and knocking him out of the cage. The angle was written as having neither Hayes nor Gordy being aware that Kerry was shoved into Hayes. As Kerry was getting to his feet inside the ring, that was the signal for Gordy to slam the cage door shut, hitting Kerry on the head and costing him the championship.

The Freebirds immediately became the top heels in the company, due to the belief of many fans that their actions cost one of their local heroes the NWA World Heavyweight Championship. As the feud was building, the WCCW television broadcasts were syndicated to television stations all across the United States, giving the promotion millions of viewers each week in the U.S. alone. This changed the face of wrestling and how it was marketed and presented to audiences. The extremely physical nature of the matches between the two factions captivated fans, changing preconceptions about what professional wrestling was and could be. Throughout the next several years, the Freebirds and Von Erichs engaged in numerous high-profile matches that were very physical in nature with the various members of each group feuding over various championships within the promotion. The feud is seen today by many fans and wrestling industry insiders as one of the best worked and most memorable feuds in the history of professional wrestling. This line of drama ended, when Kevin's brother David von Erich, died in Japan from acute enteritis of the upper intestine. This broke up the symmetry of the wrestling rivalry, though eventually the remaining brothers went on to wrestle individually, with varying degrees of success.

Feuds with Chris Adams and Ric Flair (1985–1990) 
Kevin also had a long feud with Chris Adams that lasted for months and had many violent matches, including two well-known chair shots on each other that required hospitalization for both men. Kevin would also tag-team with Adams on numerous occasions before and after their feud. Away from the ring, Kevin and Chris were close friends; Kevin served as a pallbearer during Adams' funeral in 2001 and traveled to England to visit Adams' family afterwards. In recent interviews, Kevin stated that Adams was the toughest wrestler he's ever wrestled in his career and he showed a great amount of respect for the British-born wrestler. Kevin had several close matches with NWA World Champ Ric Flair, including the main event of the 2nd David Von Erich Memorial Parade of Champions at Texas Stadium, but never won the title.

Folding of WCCW and United States Wrestling Association (1989–1990) 
After the failure of SuperClash III, in 1989, Kevin became very despondent over his father's decision to sell the promotion to Jerry Jarrett, who owned the Memphis-based CWA, despite his brother Kerry welcoming Jarrett into the mix; the merged promotions became the USWA. However, because of disputes, including suing Jarrett himself, he pulled WCCW out of the USWA in 1990, but he couldn't resurrect the promotion his father built and had no choice but shut down World Class that November. Kevin did manage to draw crowds to the Sportatorium in the early going, but with the absence of his brother, manager/booker Gary Hart, and the lack of televised matches, World Class' survival was very thin. During that time, Kevin competed very little; other than wrestling in other independent cards promoted by either himself, Chris Adams or Gary Hart. Kevin did not participate at all in the August 4, 1989 card in which World Class formally became USWA Texas, while brother Kerry, who competed on the card earlier, reportedly left the Sportatorium shortly after his match. Kevin however did help out a young Steve Austin increase his abilities in the ring during this time, and considers Austin as one of his friends to this day.

World Wrestling Federation (1991) 
Sixteen months after his brother joined the World Wrestling Federation, Kevin wrestled a dark match on December 2, 1991 at a Wrestling Challenge taping in Corpus Christi, TX where he faced and defeated Brian Lee.

Later career (1991–1995) 
Von Erich competed in Mexico's Consejo Mundial de Lucha Libre in 1991. On April 2, 1993 he teamed up with Chris Adams to defeat Fabulous Freebirds' Michael Hayes and Buddy Roberts at Global Wrestling Federation's Adkisson Benefit Show at the Sportatorium. Kevin's last round of glory occurred on January 7, 1995 while competing for Jim Crockett, Jr.'s NWA promotion based at the Sportatorium; where he won the North American heavyweight title defeating Greg Valentine. A week later he dropped the title to John Hawk. He then formed a very brief alliance with manager Skandor Akbar. Kevin eventually cut back on his ring appearances and formally retired by the end of 1995.

Retirement 
On October 3, 2005, Kevin made an appearance on the WWE Raw Homecoming show alongside other WWE Hall of Famers. Later that night, as Dusty Rhodes and the WWE Hall of Famers were gathered in the ring, Rob Conway came out and interrupted Rhodes. This eventually led to Conway's beatdown by several Hall of Famers, in which Kevin used the legendary Iron Claw on Conway, to the raves of the partisan Dallas, Texas crowd. Jim Ross said afterwards that he never thought he would live to see the Iron Claw again. On January 20, 2006, Kevin and his son Ross Adkisson (billed as Ross Von Erich) appeared on a local wrestling card in Longview, Texas as guests of Roddy Piper's Piper's Pit. During the segment, in which Kevin and Piper talked about going to the Sportatorium as teenagers, Skandor Akbar interrupted the interview to berate both Kevin and Ross. At one point, Akbar pushed Ross, which prompted Kevin to apply the iron claw on Akbar. Greg Valentine then pulled Akbar away, with Kevin, Ross, Piper and The Grappler taking in the cheers of the crowd. In 2006, Kevin, and a number of others from World Class Championship Wrestling's heyday, participated in Heroes of World Class Wrestling, an independently produced retrospective documentary about the promotion and the Von Erich family. The documentary featured comments from Adkisson, Gary Hart, Skandor Akbar, Bill Mercer, Mickey Grant, David Manning, Marc Lowrance and via earlier interviews, Chris Adams.

Later that October he sold the rights to the (pre-1988) WCCW name and tape archives to World Wrestling Entertainment (WWE). WWE subsequently began broadcasting WCCW's syndicated programming on their subscription video on demand service WWE Classics On Demand with Kevin and Michael "P.S." Hayes acting as hosts and later included WCCW footage on the WWE Network. WWE produced The Triumph and Tragedy of World Class, their own documentary on the territory in 2007. Kevin was also featured in the 2007 WWE produced DVD The Most Powerful Families in Wrestling in a segment on the Von Erich family. On April 4, 2009, Kevin represented the Von Erich family as they were inducted into the WWE Hall of Fame by Michael Hayes. On June 15, 2014, at Slammiversary, Kevin accompanied his sons Ross and Marshall to the ring for a tag-team match. On April 2, 2016 Kevin appeared at the WWE Hall of Fame ceremony to discuss his relationship with The Fabulous Freebirds.

Brief comeback (2017) 
At 60 years of age, Von Erich returned to wrestling for the first time in 22 years on July 9, 2017. He teamed with his sons Ross and Marshall as they defeated Marty Jannetty, Jumping Lee and Gery Roif at The Rage Wrestling Mega Show in Tel Aviv, Israel.

Personal life 
He has been married since August 1, 1980 to Pam Adkisson. They currently live in Hawaii and run a family investment business together. Kevin also dabbles in commercial real estate, and owns the rights to Southwest Sports (the distributor of World Class Championship Wrestling), which was later renamed K.R. Adkisson Enterprises. Together they have four children; Kristen Rain (born February 3, 1981), Jillian Lindsey (born February 10, 1985), David Michael Ross (Ross Von Erich) (born June 1, 1988), and Kevin Marshall (Marshall Von Erich) (born November 10, 1992). He and Pam have 11 grandchildren as well. Kristen and Joseph Nikolas, her husband, have one daughter, Adeline Claire, twin sons Eli and Rush, and sons Abram and Josiah. Jill is the mother of three daughters and a son. His son Marshall and wife Coral have two sons.

Kevin is the last surviving son of wrestler Fritz Von Erich and had four brothers who wrestled, David, Kerry, Mike and Chris, as well as an older brother, Jack, who died in 1959.

Other media
Adkisson, as Kevin Von Erich, appears in the video games Legends of Wrestling, Legends of Wrestling II, Showdown: Legends of Wrestling, WWE 2K17 and WWE 2K18.

A biopic feature film titled The Iron Claw starring Zac Efron went into principal photography in 2022.

Championships and accomplishments 

 All Japan Pro Wrestling
 All Asia Tag Team Championship (1 time) - with David Von Erich
Cauliflower Alley Club
Art Abrams Lifetime Achievement/Lou Thesz Award (2017)
 NWA Big Time Wrestling / World Class Championship Wrestling / World Class Wrestling Association
 NWA American Heavyweight Championship (5 times)
 NWA American Tag Team Championship (4 times) - with David Von Erich (1), El Halcon (1), and Kerry Von Erich (2)
 NWA Texas Tag Team Championship (2 times) - with David Von Erich
 NWA World Six-Man Tag Team Championship (Texas version) (7 times) - with David and Kerry Von Erich (2), Fritz Von Erich and Mike Von Erich (1), Kerry Von Erich and Mike Von Erich (3), and Kerry Von Erich and Brian Adias (1)
 NWA World Tag Team Championship (1 time) - with David Von Erich
 WCCW Television Championship (1 time)
 WCWA Texas Heavyweight Championship (2 times)
 WCWA World Heavyweight Championship (1 time)
 WCWA World Six-Man Tag Team Championship (4 times) - with Kerry Von Erich and Lance Von Erich (1), Mike Von Erich and Lance Von Erich (1), Chris Adams and Steve Simpson (1), and Kerry Von Erich and Michael Hayes (1)
 WCWA World Tag Team Championship (3 times) - with Kerry Von Erich
 NWA Southwest
 NWA North American Heavyweight Championship (1 time)
 Pro Wrestling Illustrated
 Ranked No. 78 of the top 500 singles wrestlers in the PWI 500 in 1991
 Ranked No. 85 of the top 500 singles wrestlers of the "PWI Years" in 2003
 Ranked No. 23 of the top 100 tag teams of the "PWI Years" with David, Mike, and Kerry Von Erich in 2003
 St. Louis Wrestling Club
 NWA Missouri Heavyweight Championship (1 time)
St. Louis Wrestling Hall of Fame
Class of 2016 
 Western States Sports
 NWA Western States Tag Team Championship (1 time) - with David Von Erich
 WWE
 WWE Hall of Fame (Class of 2009) as a member of the Von Erich family
 Wrestling Observer Newsletter
 Match of the Year (1984) with Mike and Kerry Von Erich vs. the Fabulous Freebirds (Buddy Roberts, Michael Hayes, and Terry Gordy) in an Anything Goes match on July 4

See also 
 Von Erich Family

References

External links 
 
 
 
 

1957 births
20th-century professional wrestlers
Living people
American football running backs
American male professional wrestlers
American United Methodists
North Texas Mean Green football players
Sportspeople from Belleville, Illinois
People from Denton, Texas
People from Kauai
Professional wrestlers from Texas
Von Erich family
WWE Hall of Fame inductees
All Asia Tag Team Champions